Ashutosh Ganguly, better known by his stage name Ash King, is a British singer, songwriter and composer. He made his playback singing debut in Rakeysh Omprakash Mehra's Delhi-6. He is a relative of prominent Indian singer Kishore Kumar. He has also sung the song "Carbon Copy" in the movie Drishyam.

Personal life
Ash King hails from a family of musicians who has shaped his relationship with music. His grandfather Brajendra Lal Ganguly was the first Indian classical music teacher at Nobel laureate Rabindranath Tagore's home and school Shantiniketan, and also a prominent freedom fighter for India and close ally of Subhas Chandra Bose and first cousin of Kishore Kumar's father. King spent his childhood surrounded by celebrated musical artists with whom his father worked closely with. His father used to perform with Ravi Shankar in India back in the sixties. According to him, when he was very young, George Harrison visited their house at Wembley as he was into Indian classical music. His mother hails from Karamsad, Gujarat.

He was influenced early on by joining a Gospel choir.

Career
His first Bollywood break was with A. R. Rahman on the film Delhi-6 which he recorded at Rahman's personal studio. Rahman invited King, to his London home after friends sang his praises. He was impressed with the 25-year-old's voice, he flew him to Chennai to record in his private studio. Since then he has gone on to sing Te Amo for the film Dum Maaro Dum, I Love You for the film Bodyguard and featured on Suno Aisha from the film Aisha.

Ash Featured on Lady Gaga's official single for Bad Romance on a remix of Just Dance, this was also used in the remix album and the Asian release of the album.

Ash is also a prominent singer in the UK, having sung and co-written the song Love Is Blind which he sang with singer Ramzi and featured on the song Look For Me with Hard Kaur. In 2011, Ash performed at some of the biggest events in the UK including performances at Glastonbury Festival for the BBC and also performed on the main stage at the BBC London Mela.

After 2011, in 2012 Ash was appointed for a Bengali song "Kothin" of Bojhena Shey Bojhena film. He also took part in MTV India's 'MTV Unplugged' – Series 2, with a whole episode dedicated to his hits. Other performers included A R Rahman, Sunidhi Chauhan and Shafqat Amanat Ali Khan. In April 2013 he headlined a concert at the Southbank Centre in London, alongside Sufi/Bollywood singer Harshdeep Kaur.

Filmography

Non-film
 Look For Me
 Take It Easy
 Love Is Blind 
 Bad Romance Remix from Lady Gaga Just Dance Album with Lady Gaga, Lush, Wedis and Young Thoro
 Revels, 2017 at Manipal Institute of Technology.
 Kishmish, with QARAN & Momina Mustehsan
 Haaye Oye – QARAN ft. Ash King

Accolades

References

External links
 Official Web Site for Ash King
 

1979 births
British playback singers
Singers from London
Bollywood playback singers
British people of Indian descent
Living people
Bengali playback singers
21st-century English singers